Kim Jin-min (born 1972), is a South Korean television director.

Career
Kim Jin-min left MBC in 2016 and signed with Bon Factory.

Personal life
They married in February 2004.

Filmography

Television

Awards
 9th Korea Drama Awards: Best Production Director for Marriage Contract.

References

External links
  (mixed with the 1970 born film director of the same name)
 

1972 births
Living people
South Korean television directors